Vibe was a syndicated American late-night talk show that was spun off from the magazine of the same name. Premiering in August 1997, it was produced by Quincy Jones and hosted by Chris Spencer, and featured a brief appearance by President Bill Clinton on its first episode. Like The Arsenio Hall Show of the early 1990s, it attracted young, urban audiences. Spencer was fired in October of that year and replaced by comedian Sinbad, along with Big Boy as the in-house announcer. The show would only last until the summer of 1998 when it was cancelled. The show was taped from CBS Television City in Los Angeles.

See also 
List of late night network TV programs

References

External links

1997 American television series debuts
1998 American television series endings
1990s American variety television series
1990s American television talk shows
1990s American late-night television series
First-run syndicated television programs in the United States
Television series by Sony Pictures Television
English-language television shows